The First Offence is a 1936 British low-budget "quota quickie" drama film directed by Herbert Mason, produced by Michael Balcon for Gainsborough Pictures and distributed by Gaumont-British Distributors. The cast includes John Mills, Lilli Palmer and Bernard Nedell. The story was written by Stafford Dickens and Austin Melford. It is a remake of the 1934 French film Mauvaise Graine, directed by Billy Wilder.

Plot

A wealthy doctor's rich and spoiled son, Johnnie Penrose joins a gang of car thieves in France after being denied a car by his father.

Cast

 John Mills as Johnnie Penrose
 Lilli Palmer as Jeanette
 Bernard Nedell as The Boss
 Michel André as Michel
 H. G. Stoker as Doctor Penrose
 Jean Wall as The Zebra
 Paul Velsa as Peanuts
 Marcel Maupi as Man in Panama Hat
 Judy Kelly as Girl in Garage
 Marcel André as Michel

Production
The film was originally called Bad Blood and was going to star Paul Robeson.

Filming took place in London.

References

Bibliography
 Bergfelder, Tim & Cargnelli, Christian. Destination London: German-speaking emigrés and British cinema, 1925-1950. Berghahn Books, 2008.
 Neale, Stephen. (2012). The Classical Hollywood Reader. Routledge

External links

The First Offence at Britmovie | Home of British Films
The First Offence at AllMovie

1936 drama films
1936 films
British drama films
British black-and-white films
1930s English-language films
Films directed by Herbert Mason
British remakes of French films
Gainsborough Pictures films
Quota quickies
Films produced by Michael Balcon
1930s British films